The members of the 13th Manitoba Legislature were elected in the Manitoba general election held in July 1910. The legislature sat from February 9, 1911, to June 15, 1914.

The Conservatives led by Rodmond Roblin formed the government.

Tobias Norris of the Liberal Party was Leader of the Opposition.

James Johnson served as speaker for the assembly.

There were four sessions of the 13th Legislature:

Daniel Hunter McMillan was Lieutenant Governor of Manitoba until August 1, 1911, when Douglas Colin Cameron became lieutenant governor.

Members of the Assembly 
The following members were elected to the assembly in 1910:

Notes:

By-elections 
By-elections were held to replace members for various reasons:

Notes:

References 

Terms of the Manitoba Legislature
1911 establishments in Manitoba
1914 disestablishments in Manitoba